The Third Alaska State Legislature served from January 1963 to January 1965.

Senate

House

See also
 List of Alaska State Legislatures
 2nd Alaska State Legislature, the legislature preceding this one
 4th Alaska State Legislature, the legislature following this one
 List of governors of Alaska
 List of speakers of the Alaska House of Representatives
 Alaska Legislature
 Alaska Senate
 {AKLeg.gov}

References
General

Specific and Notes

1963 establishments in Alaska
Alaska
1964 in Alaska
Alaska
1965 disestablishments in the United States
03